Page County Courthouse may refer to:

Page County Courthouse (Iowa), Clarinda, Iowa
Page County Courthouse (Virginia), Luray, Virginia